Shin Hye-jeong, better known mononymously as Hyejeong, is a South Korean singer and actress. She is best known as a member of the South Korean girl group AOA.

Early life 
Hyejeong competed in a supermodel pageant until the 3rd preliminary round. There, an FNC Entertainment casting director discovered her, and she became a FNC trainee in August 2010.

Career

Career with AOA & AOA Cream 

On July 30, 2012, Hyejeong made her debut as a member of AOA on Mnet's M! Countdown with their debut single, Angels' Story with the title track "Elvis". So far, AOA has released 3 EPs and 9 singles in total.

Hyejeong is also part of sub-unit AOA Cream together with Yuna and Kim Chanmi. The sub-unit released first teaser on February 1, 2016.
The music video teaser for title track I'm Jelly Baby was released on February 4, 2016.
AOA Cream's title track and music video was released on February 12, 2016.

Acting career 
On August 8, 2012, Hyejeong appeared in TV series A Gentleman's Dignity.

Hyejeong appeared in the music video for boy band F.T. Island's song "I Wish" from the full Korean album Five Treasure Box which was released on September 10, 2012.

In October 2012, she was cast in a supporting role in drama "Cheongdam-dong Alice".

On October 19, 2012, Hyejeong, together with eight other stars such as Nam Ji-hyun and Jun. K, had been confirmed for tvN's dating show "The Romantic & Idol".

On August 6, 2013, Hyejeong was cast for The Blade and Petal.

Hyejeong appeared in the music video for boy band Phantom's song "Seoul Lonely" which was released on May 19, 2014. She also featured for its promotion in several music shows by overtaking Gain's part in the song.

On March 4, 2015, it was revealed that Hyejeong will be part of MBC's new variety show "Soulmate Returns" together with other cast members.

On September 10, 2015, Hyejeong was listed in the lineup for SBS MTV EDM Program 'Mashup' that will be aired on 21st at 11PM KST for the first time.

In 2016, Hyejeong was cast in her first social film Mysterious Solver together with F.T. Island's Choi Min-hwan.

In March 2017, it was confirmed that Hyejeong will be joining tvN's Saturday Night Live Korea for season 9. The first episode will be broadcast on March 25, 2017.

In January 2018, casual denim brand Buckaroo announced Hyejeong as their new model for the 2018 S/S season.

In February 2018, it has been revealed that Hyejeong will have a lead role in SBS weekend drama Nice Witch as flight attendant Joo Yebin.

In 2019, Hyejeong together with Seo Yu-na and Kim Chanmi will take part in Lifetime's reality program AOA DaSaDanang Heart Attack Danang where the members will travel to Danang, Vietnam for an adventure.

In February 2020, Hyejeong was cast in upcoming tvN drama 'My Unfamiliar Family'.

In March 2023, Hyejeong signed with new agency TH Company.

Discography

Soundtrack appearances and solo performances

Filmography

Film

Television series

Web series

Reality program

Variety shows

Awards and nominations

References

External links 

 
 

AOA (group) members
Living people
K-pop singers
South Korean female idols
South Korean women pop singers
People from Seoul
South Korean female models
South Korean television personalities
South Korean dance musicians
South Korean film actresses
South Korean television actresses
Japanese-language singers of South Korea
Mandarin-language singers of South Korea
South Korean rhythm and blues singers
Actresses from Seoul
Weekly Idol members
1993 births